Eucosma yasudai is a species of moth of the family Tortricidae. It is found in Russia and Japan.

The wingspan is 15–21 mm.

See also
 List of moths of Japan

References

External links 
 Image at Harmony Museum, Japan 
 Eucosma at BugGuide.Net

Eucosmini
Moths described in 1982
Moths of Japan